Daniel Freire Mendes, (born 18 January 1981 in São Paulo) is a retired Brazilian football player who started his career in Brazil back in 1999 with only 18 years of age, moved in 2014 to U.S to play for Minnesota United FC, after a long career in the Allsvenskan, the Swedish top league.

Career 
He has previously played for Kalmar FF , AIK and Degerfors IF.

Mendes scored Allsvenskan's fastest goal in history after only 6 seconds. In 2006, Mendes scored most goals per minute played for AIK. All of his goals were scored as a substitute, earning him a reputation as the squad's "super sub".

In 2014, Mendes left Sweden to go on loan with Minnesota United FC in the NASL. His stay was made permanent on October 9. Mendes remained with Minnesota until their move to Major League Soccer following the 2016 NASL season.

Mendes joined the Major Arena Soccer League's Florida Tropics SC midway through their first season in early 2017.

After the arena season ended, Mendes stayed in Florida, signing with The Villages SC of the fourth-division Premier Development League.

In December 2017, Mendes agreed to a new deal with the Tropics and returned to the team's lineup.

References

External links
 Florida Tropics SC bio
 
 Profile at Kalmar FF official website
 

1981 births
Living people
Atlético Nacional footballers
Brazilian footballers
Brazilian expatriate footballers
Degerfors IF players
Kalmar FF players
AIK Fotboll players
Ulsan Hyundai FC players
K League 1 players
Allsvenskan players
Superettan players
Botafogo de Futebol e Regatas players
Sport Club Corinthians Paulista players
Clube Atlético Juventus players
GAIS players
Minnesota United FC (2010–2016) players
Expatriate footballers in Sweden
Expatriate footballers in South Korea
Expatriate soccer players in the United States
Sociedade Esportiva Palmeiras players
Brazilian expatriate sportspeople in South Korea
North American Soccer League players
Association football forwards
USL League Two players
Florida Tropics SC players
Major Arena Soccer League players
Brazilian men's futsal players
The Villages SC players
Brazilian expatriate sportspeople in Sweden
Brazilian expatriate sportspeople in the United States
Footballers from São Paulo